Totara was a parliamentary electorate in the West Coast
of New Zealand from 1871 to 1881. It was represented by two Members of Parliament

Population centres
The 1870 electoral redistribution was undertaken by a parliamentary select committee based on population data from the 1867 New Zealand census. Eight sub-committees were formed, with two members each making decisions for their own province; thus members set their own electorate boundaries. The number of electorates was increased from 61 to 72, and Totara was one of the new electorates.

The Totara electorate covered the West Coast south of, but not including, Hokitika. Settlements included Ross, Hari Hari, Whataroa, and Haast. The southern boundary of the electorate met the Tasman Sea at Awarua Point. In the 1875 electoral redistribution, the Totara electorate was unaltered. In the 1881 electoral redistribution, the Totara electorate was abolished and replaced with the  electorate. The boundaries of this new electorate were almost identical but for the adjustment at the northern end, which brought the town of Hokitika into the new electorate.

History
Tribe died on 19 March 1877 while in office.

Election results
The electorate was represented by two Members of Parliament:

Key

Notes

References

Historical electorates of New Zealand
1870 establishments in New Zealand
1881 disestablishments in New Zealand
Politics of the West Coast, New Zealand